Siim Sellis (born 5 May 1987 in Tali) is an Estonian cross-country skier.

Sellis competed at the 2014 Winter Olympics for Estonia. He placed 59th in the qualifying round in the sprint, failing to advance to the knockout stages.

Sellis made his World Cup debut in January 2006. As of April 2014, his best finish is 10th, in a classical sprint race at Lahti in 2011–12. His best World Cup overall finish is 118th, in 2011–12. His best World Cup finish in a discipline is 67th, in the 2011-12 sprint.

References

1987 births
Living people
People from Saarde Parish
Olympic cross-country skiers of Estonia
Cross-country skiers at the 2014 Winter Olympics
Estonian male cross-country skiers
21st-century Estonian people